Neocollyris vitalisi is a species of ground beetle in the genus Neocollyris in the family Carabidae. It was described by Horn in 1924.

References

Vitalisi, Neocollyris
Beetles described in 1924